Aleksandr Vladimirovich Zaikin (born 15 January 1988) is a Russian professional football player.

External links
 
 
 

1988 births
Footballers from Moscow
Living people
Russian footballers
Russian Premier League players
FC Dynamo Moscow players
FC Olimpia Volgograd players
Association football midfielders
Association football forwards
FC Petrotrest players
FC Veles Moscow players
FC Torpedo Vladimir players
FC MVD Rossii Moscow players
FC Volga Ulyanovsk players